Elliot Davis may refer to:

 Elliot Davis (composer), British composer, musician and music documentary maker
 Elliot Davis (cinematographer) (born 1948), American cinematographer

See also
 Eliot Davis (1871–1954), member of the New Zealand Legislative Council